One Nation Underground is the title of the first studio album released by Hawaii, a speed metal band from the United States.

Track listing
All songs by Marty Friedman and Jeff Graves, except where indicated.

Notes
"Living in Sin" and "Escape the Night" had previously been recorded by Marty Friedman's pre-Hawaii outfit Vixen for their Made in Hawaii EP (1983). "Secrets of the Stars" was also featured on the Shrapnel Records compilation U.S. Metal Vol. III (1983).

Personnel 
Hawaii
Gary St. Pierre - bass guitar, lead vocals
Marty Friedman - guitars, backing vocals 
Jeff Graves - drums, backing vocals

Additional musicians
Rocky DeSopa, Roger Holland - additional backing vocals

Production
Pierre Grill - producer, engineer

References

Hawaii (band) albums
1983 debut albums
Shrapnel Records albums